Ramesh Kumar is an Indian professional Kabaddi player. He was part of the teams which won gold medal at 2002 Asian Games, 2006 Asian Games, and the 2004 Kabaddi World Cup. In 2005, government of India conferred Arjuna Award on him for his achievements in the sport.

Hailing from Kirmara village of Haryana state's Hisar district, Kumar started playing kabaddi in 1992 and was selected for the senior state team of Haryana in 1995. Between 2004 and 2006, he served as captain of the Indian national team for three years. In 2008, government of Haryana appointed him as an inspector in the state police.

References

Living people
Indian kabaddi players
Asian Games medalists in kabaddi
Kabaddi players at the 2002 Asian Games
Kabaddi players at the 2006 Asian Games
Asian Games gold medalists for India
Medalists at the 2002 Asian Games
Medalists at the 2006 Asian Games
Kabaddi players from Haryana
People from Hisar district
Year of birth missing (living people)
Recipients of the Arjuna Award